Anna Whitelock, is a British historian and academic, specialising in the History of Monarchy. She is Professor of the History of Monarchy at City, University of London and Director of the Centre for the Study of Modern Monarchy.

Career 
Whitelock received her PhD from Corpus Christi College, Cambridge in 2004 under the supervision of Dr David Starkey. She is Professor in the History of Monarchy at City, University of London, having previously taught at Royal Holloway, University of London.

Whitelock is an elected Fellow of the Royal Historical Society (FRHistS). She won the PEN Weld Award for Biography.

Works 
  Mary Tudor  England's First Queen, London : Bloomsbury, 2010 , 
 Elizabeth's Bedfellows: An Intimate History of the Queen's Court, London : Bloomsbury, 2014. ,

References

External links 
 http://www.annawhitelock.co.uk/
 http://onthetudortrail.com/Blog/book-talk/author-interviews/q-a-with-anna-whitelock/

Living people
Fellows of the Royal Historical Society
Alumni of Corpus Christi College, Cambridge
Academics of Royal Holloway, University of London
British women historians
21st-century British historians
21st-century British women writers
Year of birth missing (living people)